Martin Quinn (1938 – 12 December 2021) was an Irish Gaelic footballer who played at club level with Kilbride and at inter-county level with the Meath senior football team. He usually lined out at full back.

Career

Quinn was full-back on the Kilbride team that earned promotion from junior to senior in the space of five seasons. After winning the respective Meath JFC and Meath IFC titles in 1960 and 1962, he won his first Meath SFC title in 1964. He won a second title in 1967 and then completed a three-in-a-row between 1969 and 1971. Having represented the Meath minor football team for two years, Quinn made his senior debut in a tournament game against Kerry in 1958. He was one of the key figures on the team that won the Leinster Championship in 1964. A suspension ruled him out of Meath's Leinster Championship success in 1966, but was introduced as a late substitute in the All-Ireland final against Galway. Quinn was a member of the panel, alongside his brothers Jack and Gerry, when Meath beat Cork in the 1967 All-Ireland final.

Death

Quinn died on 12 December 2021.

Honours

Kilbride
Meath Senior Football Championship: 1964, 1967, 1969, 1970, 1971
Meath Intermediate Football Championship: 1962
Meath Junior Football Championship: 1960

Meath
All-Ireland Senior Football Championship: 1967
Leinster Senior Football Championship: 1964, 1967

References

1938 births
2021 deaths
Kilbride Gaelic footballers
Meath inter-county Gaelic footballers
Winners of one All-Ireland medal (Gaelic football)